Fianna Fáil leadership election may refer to:

 1959 Fianna Fáil leadership election
 1966 Fianna Fáil leadership election
 1979 Fianna Fáil leadership election
 1992 Fianna Fáil leadership election
 1994 Fianna Fáil leadership election
 2008 Fianna Fáil leadership election
 2011 Fianna Fáil leadership election